Ruby Rodriguez (born January 10, 1966) is a Filipino actress and one of the former hosts of the Philippine noontime variety show Eat Bulaga!.

Career
Rodriguez originally started her career as a preschool teacher, later appearing in a recurring role in Okay Ka, Fairy Ko! alongside Vic Sotto and Aiza Seguerra. She has been starring as one of Eat Bulaga!'''s hosts since 1991 and has since then become a regular host.

Rodriguez joined Eat Bulaga! at the age of 25, replacing Helen Vela, who left the show due to medical and health reasons that would result to her death a year later. However, in the same year, she officially left Eat Bulaga! after 30 years as a co-host, counting her hiatus in hosting the program due to the pandemic, due to her having to take care of her son who has dyslexia, and then, her relocation to the United States to be with her daughter.

As of 2021, she is now living in Los Angeles, California and currently works at the Philippine Consulate Office.

FilmographyOha! Ako Pa?!Humanap Ka ng PangetEnteng Kabisote: Okay ka, Fairy Ko: The LegendEnteng Kabisote 2: Okay Ka Fairy Ko: The Legend ContinuesEnteng Kabisote 3: Okay Ka, Fairy Ko: The Legend Goes On and On and OnEnteng Kabisote 4: Okay Ka Fairy Ko...The Beginning of the LegendOkay ka, Fairy ko!Okay ka, Fairy ko! 2Okay ka, fairy ko! 3Alabang GirlsPitong GamolKaputol Ng Isang Awit (1991)Eat all you can (1992)Boyfriend kong Gamol (1993)Sala sa init Sala sa lamig (1993) as MalouRelaks ka lang, Sagot kita (1994) as LizettePustahan Tayo, Mahal mo ako (1995) as VickyProboys (1995)Abrakadabra (1994) as Sadama HusinaUtang ng Ama (2003)
Basta't kasama kita (1995)
Ouija (2007)
Urduja (2008)Si Agimat at Si Enteng Kabisote (2010)Enteng Ng Ina Mo (2011)My Little Bossings (2013) as Janet NapulisMy Bebe Love'' (2015)

Television

References

1966 births
Living people
Filipino television variety show hosts
Filipino women comedians
Filipino film actresses
Filipino television actresses
Filipino people of Spanish descent
Actresses from Manila
GMA Network personalities
20th-century Filipino actresses
21st-century Filipino actresses